The 2009 FIBA Europe Under-20 Championship Division B was the 5th edition of the Division B of the FIBA Europe Under-20 Championship, the second-tier level of European Under-20 basketball. The city of Skopje, in the Republic of Macedonia, hosted the tournament. Netherlands won their first title.

The Netherlands and the Czech Republic were promoted to Division A.

Teams

Squads

Preliminary round
The seventeen teams were allocated in four groups (one groups of five teams and three groups of four). The two top teams of each group advanced to the Qualifying Round. The last three teams of each group advanced to the Classification Round.

Group A

Group B

Group C

Group D

Qualifying round
The eight top teams were allocated in two groups of four teams each. Teams coming from the same initial group didn't play again vs. each other, but "carried" the results of the matches played between them for the first round.

Group E

Group F

Classification round
The last three teams of each of the preliminary round groups were allocated in three groups of three teams each.

Group G

Group H

Group I

Final classification round
The nine teams of the Classification Round were allocated in another three groups of three teams, depending on their position in the previous round. Group J determined positions 9th to 11th, Group K determined positions 12th to 14th and Group L determined positions 15th to 17th (last).

Group J

Group K

Group L

Knockout stage

5th–8th playoffs

Championship

Final standings

Stats leaders

Points

Rebounds

Assists

References

FIBA.com
FIBA Europe Archive

FIBA U20 European Championship Division B
2009–10 in European basketball
2009–10 in Republic of Macedonia basketball
International youth basketball competitions hosted by North Macedonia
2000s in Skopje
July 2009 sports events in Europe
Sports competitions in Skopje